Gum Swamp Creek is a tributary of the Little Ocmulgee River in the U.S. state of Georgia. Via the Little Ocmulgee and Ocmulgee rivers, it is part of the Altamaha River basin draining to the Atlantic Ocean.

See also
List of rivers of Georgia

References 

USGS Hydrologic Unit Map - State of Georgia (1974)

Rivers of Georgia (U.S. state)